The First Woman is a 1922 American silent drama film directed by Glen Lyons and starring Mildred Harris, Percy Marmont and Lloyd Hammond.

Cast
 Mildred Harris as The Girl
 Percy Marmont as Paul Marsh
 Lloyd Hammond as Jack Gordon
 Donald Blakemore as Tom Markham
 Oliver La Baddie as Professor Bazzufi
 Wallace Baker as Eloysius Bangs
 Andrew Hicks as Mr. Sham
 A. West as Judge Stone
 Joseph G. Portell as Jacquis
 Hubert La Baddie as Murat
 Corydon W. Hatt as The Priest
 Walter Orr as James
 Ernest Blasdell as Detective
 Stephen Geitz as Police Sergeant
 Mrs. J. Montgomery as Mrs. Giggleton
 Betty Hall as Marie
 Flora Arline Arle as Elsa

References

Bibliography
 Munden, Kenneth White. The American Film Institute Catalog of Motion Pictures Produced in the United States, Part 1. University of California Press, 1997.

External links
 

1922 films
1922 drama films
1920s English-language films
American silent feature films
Silent American drama films
American black-and-white films
Film Booking Offices of America films
1920s American films